James Hoyle (born 4 March 1985 in Weymouth, England) was a rugby union player for Newcastle Falcons in the Guinness Premiership.

James Hoyle's position of choice is as a centre or on the wing. He is the cousin of upcoming starlet Zack Phillips, who currently plays for Weymouth FC's youth team.

Known by many as "The Rampaging Ferret", he quickly developed a cult following. Unfortunately his career was cut short by a chronic Xbox Live addiction.

Hoyle's career highlight, arguably, came in his final game for the Falcons when, whilst injured, he scored a last minute winning try against Leicester to claim a European place for the North East side. The try led to the now famous and widely memed headline "Last gasp ferret stuns Tigers".

References

External links
Newcastle Falcons profile

1985 births
Living people
Newcastle Falcons players